National Union of Students may refer to:

Europe

British Isles
National Union of Students (United Kingdom)
National Union of Students-Union of Students in Ireland
National Union of Students Scotland
National Union of Students Wales

Scandinavia
Danish National Union of Students
National Union of Students in Finland
National Union of Students in Norway
Swedish National Union of Students

Elsewhere in Europe
Austrian Students' Association
Dutch National Union of Students
National Union of Students of France
National Union of Students in Germany
National Union of Students in Hungary
National Union of Italian University Students
Lithuanian National Union of Students
Lithuanian National Union of Student Representations
National Union of Students in Luxembourg
National Union of Students in Switzerland
National Union of Students in Syria
National Union of Students in Iceland

Outside Europe
National Union of Students (Australia)
National Union of Students (Brazil)
National Union of Students (Canada)
National Union of Students and Pupils of Mali
National Union of Students (Papua New Guinea)
National Union of Students of Saudi Arabia

See also

European Students' Union - the European wide federation of many national students' unions
International Union of Students